George Glover was an Anglican priest, Archdeacon of Sudbury from his installation on 21 July 1823 until his death on 4 May 1862.

Glover was born on 26 April 1779 and educated at Brasenose College, Oxford, where he matriculated in 1797 and graduated in 1801. For many years he held the livings of Southrepps and Gayton.

References

1779 births
1862 deaths
19th-century English Anglican priests
Alumni of Brasenose College, Oxford
Archdeacons of Sudbury